The St. Luke's Protestant Episcopal Church  is a historic Episcopal church located in Seaford, Sussex County, Delaware. It was built in 1843, and reconstructed in 1904.  It is a two-story, brick Gothic Revival style building.  It has a one-story chancel and crenellated three-story tower.  It features stained glass lancet windows.  Concrete buttresses were installed in 1943.  St. Luke's was organized by the Rev. Corry Chambers in 1835, from the remnants of the former St. Mary's congregation. St. Mary's was founded in 1704, but disestablished after the American Revolution. Delaware Governor William H. H. Ross (1814-1887) is buried in the churchyard.

It was listed on the National Register of Historic Places in 1977.

References

External links
St. Luke's Episcopal Church website

Churches on the National Register of Historic Places in Delaware
Gothic Revival church buildings in Delaware
Churches completed in 1843
19th-century Episcopal church buildings
Churches in Sussex County, Delaware
Episcopal church buildings in Delaware
Seaford, Delaware
1843 establishments in Delaware
National Register of Historic Places in Sussex County, Delaware